James Leo Krause (born June 4, 1986) is an American entrepreneur and retired mixed martial artist, who competed in the welterweight division of the UFC. A professional MMA competitor since 2007, Krause has made a name for himself fighting all over the United States, competing mainly in the Midwest region. Krause has also competed for organizations such as Bellator, WEC, the RFA, and Titan FC. He previously taught Brazilian Jiu Jitsu and mixed martial arts out of his formerly owned gym, Glory MMA & Fitness in Lee's Summit, Missouri. He was also founding a local promotion, Kansas City Fighting Alliance. He owns some Metro PCS stores in the Kansas City metropolitan area.

Background
Krause was born in Newport News, Virginia but moved to Odessa, Missouri after his parents got divorced when he was two years old. At the age of seven, Krause began training in karate. Krause began attending Odessa High School in Missouri starting in 2001 where he competed in wrestling and graduated in 2004. Krause opted out of attending college, and instead began working full-time before finding MMA at the age of 19.

Mixed martial arts career

Early career
Before turning professional in 2007, Krause had an astonishing amateur career with a record of 18–1, holding two championships, and for six consecutive months was ranked as the number one amateur in the country. On November 28, 2007 Krause made his long awaited professional debut for Kansas', Titan Fighting Championships, defeating Kevin Hengler via technical submission in the first round. Throughout 2008 and 2009, Krause fought all over the Midwest, mostly in Missouri, collecting a 10–0 record with all of his wins coming from stoppages.

World Extreme Cagefighting
In April 2009 Krause signed on with the World Extreme Cagefighting. He made his debut for the promotion on June 7, 2009 at WEC 41 against Donald Cerrone. Krause was a late-replacement for Rich Crunkilton. Krause lost the fight via first-round submission.

Krause then fought Ricardo Lamas on the preliminary card of WEC 44 on November 18, 2009. After being controlled on the ground for three rounds, Krause lost the fight via unanimous decision. Krause was released from his contract after going 0–2 for the promotion.

Bellator Fighting Championships
Krause signed with Bellator Fighting Championships in April 2010, replacing Ferrid Kheder in the Bellator Season Two Lightweight Tournament. His first bout of the tournament was originally slated for Bellator 15 but was instead moved to a week earlier and held on the Bellator 14 card. Krause fought Season One's runner-up, Toby Imada, losing via second-round armbar submission. The loss took Krause out of the tournament.

Krause was expected to compete on the Bellator 16 card against an unnamed opponent but was forced off the card due to an injury.

Titan Fighting Championships
After being released from Bellator, Krause re-signed with Titan Fighting Championships. His return came at Titan Fighting Championships 17 on March 25, 2011 against Nathan Schut. Krause won the fight via TKO after connecting with a head kick.

At Titan Fighting Championships 19 on July 29, 2011 Krause fought Pride FC and Sengoku veteran, Clay French, in the main event. Krause lost the fight via split decision.

Two months after his loss to French, Krause fought Steve Schneider at Shark Fights 19, winning via second-round submission (rear-naked choke). 

Krause fought Sean Wilson at Titan Fighting Championships 20 on September 23, 2011, winning via first-round submission.

Resurrection Fighting Alliance
Krause was scheduled to fight UFC veteran, Chad Reiner, at the inaugural event for Resurrection Fighting Alliance on Friday, December 16, 2011. However, a few days before the fight, Reiner was forced off the card due to an injury. After going through five different opponents, Krause fought Mark Korzenowski. Krause won the fight via head kick knockout only seconds into the first round.

The Ultimate Fighter
Krause was selected as one of 32 fighters to compete on The Ultimate Fighter: Live which aired in March, 2012. In order to gain entry into the Ultimate Fighter house, and become an official cast member, the fighters had to win an exhibition bout with another potential contestant. Krause was matched up against the relative unknown Team Black House fighter Justin Lawrence. Krause was upset by Lawrence, losing the fight via first round TKO, and ending Krause's time on The Ultimate Fighter.

Return to Resurrection Fighting Alliance
After being eliminated from the Ultimate Fighter, Krause returned to his contract with Resurrection Fighting Alliance. His second fight with the promotion took place at Resurrection Fighting Alliance 3 on June 30, 2012. Krause fought a fellow TUF castaway in Amir Khillah. After three entertaining back and forth rounds, Krause was announced the winner via split decision.

Krause next fought at Resurrection Fighting Alliance 4 which took place on November 2, 2012 in Las Vegas, Nevada. He fought undefeated Brazilian prospect, Guilherme Trindade. Only 31 seconds into the first round Krause won the fight via KO.  With the fight ending so quickly, Resurrection Fighting Alliance offered Krause a spot on the Resurrection Fighting Alliance 5 card set to take place November 30, only a month after his latest win. Krause fought journeyman Joe Jordan on the RFA 5 card, winning the fight via submission in the third round. During the post fight interview, Krause called out to UFC matchmaker, Joe Silva, proclaiming, "Joe Silva, give me a call sometime, buddy,".

Krause then faced Toby Imada in a rematch at RFA 6 on January 18, 2013. He won the fight via unanimous decision.

Ultimate Fighting Championship
In his promotional debut, Krause faced Sam Stout on June 15, 2013 at UFC 161, replacing an injured Isaac Vallie-Flagg.  Krause won the back and forth bout, submitting Stout with a guillotine choke in the third round.  His debut also earned Krause both Submission of the Night and Fight of the Night bonus awards.

Krause faced Bobby Green on November 6, 2013 at UFC Fight Night 31. The fight ended in unusual fashion as Green had previously kicked Krause in the groin area twice, resulting in a one-point deduction.  Green then landed a blow on Krause's belt line, which resulted in Krause falling to the canvas.  Referee John McCarthy declared it a legal blow and awarded Green a TKO victory.

Krause faced Jamie Varner on May 24, 2014 at UFC 173.  Krause won the fight via TKO due to injury as Varner broke his ankle in the first round and was unable to continue into the second round.

Krause faced Jorge Masvidal on September 24, 2014 at UFC 178. He lost the fight via unanimous decision after being knocked down in the second round.

Krause faced Valmir Lázaro on February 28, 2015 at UFC 184. He lost the bout by split decision.

Krause faced Daron Cruickshank on July 25, 2015 at UFC on Fox 16. Krause won the fight by submission in the first round.

Krause faced Shane Campbell on February 21, 2016 at UFC Fight Night 83. He won the fight by unanimous decision.

Krause was expected to face Ross Pearson on July 8, 2016 at The Ultimate Fighter 23 Finale. However, Krause was pulled from the fight on June 13 for undisclosed reasons and replaced by Will Brooks.

The bout with Pearson was rescheduled and was expected to take place November 19, 2016 at UFC Fight Night 99. Subsequently on October 26, Krause pulled out of the fight citing a torn hamstring.

The Ultimate Fighter: Redemption
In February 2017, it was revealed that Krause - despite being an active UFC fighter - would compete on the UFC's reality show in the 25th season on The Ultimate Fighter: Redemption. Krause was the first pick overall for Team Dillashaw. He was initially scheduled to face Héctor Urbina on the first episode, but Urbina was unable to make weight and the bout was called off. Eventually in the third episode, Krause faced Johnny Nunez in the opening round and won via submission. He next faced Ramsey Nijem and won by unanimous decision. Krause faced Jesse Taylor in the semi-finals and lost via submission in the third round.

The Ultimate Fighter: Undefeated
On January 31, 2018, it was announced that Krause would join the coaches for Team Stipe in The Ultimate Fighter: Undefeated.

Return to the UFC 
After his stint on The Ultimate Fighter: Redemption, Krause returned to the UFC to face fellow cast member Tom Gallicchio on July 7, 2017 at The Ultimate Fighter 25 Finale. He won the fight by unanimous decision.

Krause faced Alex White on January 14, 2018 at UFC Fight Night: Stephens vs. Choi. He won the fight by unanimous decision.

Krause faced Warlley Alves on August 25, 2018 at UFC Fight Night 135. He won the fight via technical knockout in the second round.

Krause faced Sérgio Moraes on November 16, 2019 at UFC Fight Night 164. He won the fight via knockout in round three. This win earned him the Performance of the Night award.

Krause faced Trevin Giles on a 1 day notice at middleweight, replacing Antônio Arroyo, on February 8, 2020 at UFC 247. Krause also signed a new, four-fight contract with the UFC pertaining to the last-minute replacement. Krause was applauded for taking the fight last minute. He lost the back-and-forth bout via split decision. The bout was also awarded the Fight of the Night bonus award. Later in the month, Krause with his management team informed intentions to appeal the outcome on grounds of possible conflict of interest: the only judge scoring the first round for Giles was a long time pupil of Giles' cornerman Joe Soliz.

Krause faced Cláudio Silva, replacing Muslim Salikhov, on October 18, 2020. at UFC Fight Night 180. He won the fight via unanimous decision.

In August 2022, during an interview on The MMA Hour, he announced that he had no interest in fighting in the future, effectively announcing his retirement from professional competition.

Betting controversy 
On November 5, 2022, controversy arose when the call for a sports betting fraud investigation was made on a fight involving Darrick Minner, one of Krause's students, and Shayilan Nuerdanbieke at UFC Fight Night: Rodriguez vs. Lemos. The UFC was informed by sources that suspicious betting patterns had been observed on the fight. Minner became a large betting underdog just hours before the fight, and the cause of the suspicion came when Minner threw a kick with an apparently injured leg, then kicked with it again after showing signs of injury before being finished by technical knockout shortly thereafter. On November 18, the Nevada State Athletic Commission informed the UFC and Krause that Krause’s license was suspended and would remain so during the course of the investigation. The UFC then announced that any fighter who chose to continue to be coached by Krause or who continued to train in his gym, would not be permitted to participate in UFC events pending the outcome of the aforementioned government investigations. Following the controversy UFC introduced rules that prevented athletes, coaches, and their close family from betting on UFC events

Subsequently Krause opted to sell his gym – Glory MMA & Fitness – and its affiliates to the owner of the FAC MMA promotion Joe Wooster.

Championships and awards 
 Ultimate Fighting Championship
Fight of the Night (Two times) 
Performance of the Night (One time) 
Submission of the Night (One time)

Mixed martial arts record

|Win
|align=center|28–8
|Cláudio Silva
|Decision (unanimous)
|UFC Fight Night: Ortega vs. The Korean Zombie
|
|align=center|3
|align=center|5:00
|Abu Dhabi, United Arab Emirates
|
|-
|Loss
|align=center|27–8
|Trevin Giles
|Decision (split)
|UFC 247
|
|align=center|3
|align=center|5:00
|Houston, Texas, United States
|
|-
|Win
|align=center|27–7
|Sérgio Moraes
|KO (punches) 
|UFC Fight Night: Błachowicz vs. Jacaré
|
|align=center|3
|align=center|4:19
|São Paulo, Brazil
|   
|-
|Win
|align=center|26–7
|Warlley Alves
|TKO (knee and punches)
|UFC Fight Night: Gaethje vs. Vick
|
|align=center|2
|align=center|2:28
|Lincoln, Nebraska, United States
|
|-
|Win
|align=center|25–7
|Alex White
|Decision (unanimous)
|UFC Fight Night: Stephens vs. Choi
|
|align=center|3
|align=center|5:00
|St. Louis, Missouri, United States
|
|-
|Win
|align=center|24–7
|Tom Gallicchio
|Decision (unanimous)
|The Ultimate Fighter: Redemption Finale
|
|align=center|3
|align=center|5:00
|Las Vegas, Nevada, United States
|
|-
|Win
|align=center|23–7
|Shane Campbell
|Decision (unanimous)
|UFC Fight Night: Cowboy vs. Cowboy
|
|align=center|3
|align=center|5:00
|Pittsburgh, Pennsylvania, United States
|
|-
|Win
|align=center|22–7
|Daron Cruickshank
| Submission (rear-naked choke)
|UFC on Fox: Dillashaw vs. Barão 2
|
|align=center|1
|align=center|1:27
|Chicago, Illinois, United States
|
|-
|Loss
|align=center|21–7
|Valmir Lázaro
|Decision (split)
|UFC 184
|
|align=center|3
|align=center|5:00
|Los Angeles, California, United States
|
|-
|Loss
|align=center|21–6
|Jorge Masvidal
|Decision (unanimous)
|UFC 178
|
|align=center|3
|align=center|5:00
|Las Vegas, Nevada, United States
|
|-
|Win
|align=center|21–5
|Jamie Varner
|TKO (ankle injury)
|UFC 173
|
|align=center|1
|align=center|5:00
|Las Vegas, Nevada, United States
|
|-
|Loss
|align=center|20–5
|Bobby Green
|TKO (body kick)
|UFC: Fight for the Troops 3
|
|align=center|1
|align=center|3:50
|Fort Campbell, Kentucky, United States
|
|-
|Win
|align=center|20–4
|Sam Stout
|Submission (guillotine choke)
|UFC 161
|
|align=center|3
|align=center|4:47
|Winnipeg, Manitoba, Canada
|
|-
|Win
|align=center|19–4
|Toby Imada
|Decision (unanimous)
|RFA 6
|
|align=center|3
|align=center|5:00
|Kansas City, Missouri, United States
|
|-
|Win
|align=center|18–4
|Joe Jordan
|Submission (guillotine choke)
|RFA 5
|
|align=center|3
|align=center|0:19
|Kearney, Nebraska, United States
|
|-
|Win
|align=center|17–4
|Guilherme Trindade
|KO (punches)
|RFA 4
|
|align=center|1
|align=center|0:31
|Las Vegas, Nevada, United States
|
|-
|Win
|align=center|16–4
|Amir Khillah
|Decision (split)
|RFA 3
|
|align=center|3
|align=center|5:00
|Kearney, Nebraska, United States
|
|-
|Win
|align=center|15–4
|Mark Korzenowski
|KO (head kick)
|RFA 1
|
|align=center|1
|align=center|0:26
|Kearney, Nebraska, United States
|
|-
|Win
|align=center|14–4
|Sean Wilson
|Submission (guillotine choke)
|Titan FC 20
|
|align=center|1
|align=center|2:39
|Kansas City, Kansas, United States
|
|-
|Win
|align=center|13–4
|Steve Schneider
|Submission (rear-naked choke)
|Shark Fights 19
|
|align=center|2
|align=center|2:46
|Independence, Missouri, United States
|
|-
|Loss
|align=center|12–4
|Clay French
|Decision (split)
|Titan FC 19
|
|align=center|3
|align=center|5:00
|Kansas City, Kansas, United States
|
|-
|Win
|align=center|12–3
|Nathan Schut
|TKO (head kick and punches)
|Titan FC 17
|
|align=center|1
|align=center|0:41
|Kansas City, Kansas, United States
|
|-
|Loss
|align=center|11–3
|Toby Imada
|Submission (armbar)
|Bellator 14
|
|align=center|2
|align=center|2:44
|Chicago, Illinois, United States
|
|-
|Win
|align=center|11–2
|Kalel Robinson
|Submission (triangle choke)
| Titan FC 15
|
|align=center|2
|align=center|2:28
|Kansas City, Kansas, United States
|
|-
|Loss
|align=center|10–2
|Ricardo Lamas
|Decision (unanimous)
|WEC 44
|
|align=center|3
|align=center|5:00
|Las Vegas, Nevada, United States
|
|-
|Loss
|align=center|10–1
|Donald Cerrone
|Submission (rear-naked choke)
|WEC 41
|
|align=center|1
|align=center|4:38
|Sacramento, California, United States
|
|-
|Win
|align=center|10–0
|Matt Williamson
|KO (head kick)
|Close Quarters Combat
|
|align=center|1
|align=center|1:15
|Kansas City, Missouri, United States
|
|-
|Win
|align=center|9–0
|Steve Schnieder
|Submission (triangle choke)
|Titan FC 12
|
|align=center|1
|align=center|1:10 
|Kansas City, Missouri, United States
|
|-
|Win
|align=center|8–0 
|Michael Johnson
|Submission (triangle choke)
|FM: Productions
|
|align=center|1
|align=center|2:55
|Springfield, Missouri, United States
|
|-
|Win
|align=center|7–0
|Tim Bazer
|Submission (triangle choke)
|IFC: Sturgis 2008
|
|align=center|1
|align=center|4:30
|Sturgis, South Dakota, United States
|
|-
|Win
|align=center|6–0
|Ran Weathers
|Submission (triangle choke)
|IFC: Sturgis 2008
|
|align=center|1
|align=center|1:36
|Sturgis, South Dakota, United States
|
|-
|Win
|align=center|5–0
|Dan Copp
|Submission (rear-naked choke)
|IFC: Sturgis 2008
|
|align=center|1
|align=center|1:55
|Sturgis, South Dakota, United States
|
|-
|Win
|align=center|4–0
|Douglas Edwards
|Submission (choke)
|World Cage FC 2
|
|align=center|1
|align=center|1:36
|Independence, Missouri, United States
|
|-
|Win
|align=center|3–0
|Shane Hutchison
|TKO (punches)
|World Cage FC 1
|
|align=center|1
|align=center|0:34
|Independence, Missouri, United States
|
|-
|Win
|align=center|2–0
|Anthony Smith
|Submission (choke)
|True Fight Fans 1
|
|align=center|1
|align=center|2:30
|Grain Valley, Missouri, United States
|
|-
|Win
|align=center|1–0
|Kevin Hengler
|Technical Submission (choke)
|Titan FC 10
|
|align=center|1
|align=center|N/A
|Kansas City, Missouri, United States
|
|-

Mixed martial arts exhibition record

|-
|Loss
|align=center|2–2
|Jesse Taylor
|Technical Submission (guillotine choke)
|The Ultimate Fighter: Redemption
| (airdate)
|align=center|3
|align=center|2:32
|Las Vegas, Nevada, United States
|
|-
|Win
|align=center|2–1
|Ramsey Nijem
|Decision (unanimous)
|The Ultimate Fighter: Redemption
| (airdate)
|align=center|3
|align=center|5:00
|Las Vegas, Nevada, United States
|
|-
|Win
|align=center|1–1
|Johnny Nunez
|Submission (rear-naked choke)
|The Ultimate Fighter: Redemption
| (airdate)
|align=center|1
|align=center|4:45
|Las Vegas, Nevada, United States
|
|-
|Loss
|align=center|0–1
|Justin Lawrence
|TKO (punches)
|The Ultimate Fighter: Live
| (airdate)
|align=center|1
|align=center|1:25
|Las Vegas, Nevada, United States
|
|-

See also
 List of male mixed martial artists

References

External links
 

K
Mixed martial artists from Missouri
People from Odessa, Missouri
Lightweight mixed martial artists
Welterweight mixed martial artists
Middleweight mixed martial artists
Mixed martial artists utilizing karate
Mixed martial artists utilizing Brazilian jiu-jitsu
Living people
1986 births
American male karateka
American practitioners of Brazilian jiu-jitsu
People awarded a black belt in Brazilian jiu-jitsu
Sportspeople from Newport News, Virginia
People from Lee's Summit, Missouri
Ultimate Fighting Championship male fighters